While the World Was Burning is the third studio album by American rapper Saint Jhn. It was released on November 20, 2020 by Gødd Complexx under Hitco, and marketed digitally via ADA division of Warner Music Group. It features guest appearances from Kanye West, Lil Uzi Vert, Future, A Boogie wit da Hoodie, DaBaby, JID, 6Lack and Kehlani.

Background
Originally Saint Jhn had no plans to release another album in 2020, but throughout the year he managed to connect with fellow artists Kanye West, Lil Uzi Vert, Future, JID, A Boogie wit da Hoodie and Kehlani. His single "Roses" also gained massive attention over the summer and became his first solo No. 1 on the Billboard charts. Because of this, he felt "it would be irresponsible to not put out another collection". The title While the World Was Burning was inspired by the events that unfolded in 2020 such as the COVID-19 pandemic, George Floyd riots, the 2020 US election etc. Saint Jhn calls the album a capsule collection.

In late September, Saint Jhn visited Kanye West in Wyoming. In several interviews after the release of the collection, Saint Jhn said that West had gotten a hold of his number after having heard his song "Roses" 20 times in a row on a jet plane. West wanted him to come to Wyoming and record with him there and threw out the idea that he could executive produce While the World Was Burning with Rick Rubin. Saint Jhn and West later flew down to Jamaica to record with Buju Banton.

The songs "High School Reunion" and "Monica Lewinsky, Election Year" are reworked versions of songs from his 2019 album Ghetto Lenny's Love Songs.

Release and promotion
After getting massive success with the remix of his single "Roses" over the summer of 2020, Saint Jhn teased on August 25 on a (now deleted) Instagram post that he would release a collection of songs in October. In mid September, Saint Jhn announced that his album While The World Was Burning would release on October 16. On October 9, Saint Jhn would release the lead single "Gorgeous". The day after, he went to Twitter to announce that he had delayed the album to November 20.
On October 26, Saint Jhn released the single "Sucks to Be You", and two days later the cover art, release date and track listing for the album.

On November 21, a day after the release, Saint Jhn said on Twitter that the album would be updated with some tweaks and changes and a song with Kanye West that did not make the cut. The missing track titled "Smack DVD" featuring Kanye West was released a week later, however it did not get added onto the track listing of the album. Saint Jhn posted a track listing of a different version of the album to his Twitter with "Smack DVD" after "Pray 4 Me", among other track listing differences. The album was updated on streaming services to have the new track order with "Smack DVD" in the track listing a week later.

Track listing
Track listing and credits adapted from Tidal.

Personnel 
 Colin Leonard – master engineering 
 Roark Bailey –  mix engineering 
 Lee Stashenko – mix engineering 
 Erik Madrid – mix engineering 
 Giaks – vocals

Charts

References

2020 albums
Saint Jhn albums
Albums produced by Murda Beatz
Albums produced by Quay Global